Ross Durant is a former association football player who played as a defender. He represented the New Zealand national team at international level.

Durant played four official internationals for the All Whites in the space of nine days, making his debut in a 2–0 win over Australia on 21 February 1980 and earning his fourth and final cap in a 6–1 win over Solomon Islands on 29 February 1980.

Durant now teaches social studies and geography at Wellington College in New Zealand. He coached footballers Tim Brown and Leo Bertos during their time at Wellington College in their respective College Football teams.

References

Year of birth missing (living people)
Living people
New Zealand association footballers
Association football defenders
New Zealand international footballers
1980 Oceania Cup players